Maafu-o-limuloa (born sometime in the 18th century, died July(?) October(?) 1799) was the 15th Tui Kanokupolu (chief of the House of Tupou in Oceanic kingdom of Tonga).

He was a grandson of Mailelaumotomoto, the 2nd Maafu-o-Tukuiaulahi, the hereditary chief of the Vainī on Tongatapu, and a member of the Tongan reigning house of Tupou. He was proclaimed somewhere in June 1799 by the Haa Havea clan, a junior branch of the Tui Kanokupolu line.

Maafuolimuloa was killed one day after his reign began, by the Haa Ngata Tupu (a senior clan), who did not agree with the Haa Havea. It was many years before the chiefs agreed upon the successor: a distant cousin of his, Tupoumālohi, and then only to forestall ambitions of a candidate even less acceptable to them.

The exact dates of his installation and murder are not known. For sure it was not 21 April, the sometimes quoted date, the day that his predecessor was murdered, as contending chiefs erupted in fighting for at least one or two months after Tukuʻaho's dead. It was after one of them, Mulikihaʻamea, fell on 29 May 1799. Some historians claim even as late as the next inasi festival during 1800.

References
I.C. Campbell, Island Kingdom, Canterbury University Press, 1992, 2001

18th-century births
1799 deaths
Tongan monarchs
People from Tongatapu
Tongan murder victims
Murdered royalty
People murdered in Tonga